Kim Emil Jörgen Johnsson (born March 16, 1976) is a Swedish former professional ice hockey defenceman who played ten seasons in the National Hockey League (NHL) for the New York Rangers, Philadelphia Flyers, Minnesota Wild and Chicago Blackhawks. He played six seasons for the Malmö Redhawks in the Swedish Elitserien prior to his NHL career.

Playing career
Johnsson was selected 286th overall by the New York Rangers in the 1994 NHL Entry Draft, the last pick in that draft. After playing two seasons with the Rangers, he was traded to the Philadelphia Flyers on August 20, 2001, along with Jan Hlaváč, Pavel Brendl, and a 3rd-round pick in exchange for Eric Lindros. After four seasons with the Flyers, Johnsson signed a four-year contract with the Minnesota Wild on July 1, 2006. On February 12, 2010, Johnsson and Nick Leddy were traded to the Chicago Blackhawks for Cam Barker.  He played 8 regular season games for Chicago before getting injured.  Johnsson missed the remaining 14 regular season games and all 22 playoff games because of a concussion. While the Blackhawks won the Stanley Cup that year, Johnsson did not play 41 games for Chicago, and Chicago did not request his name be included among the 52 names engraved on the Stanley Cup. Johnsson never played again after suffering his concussion.

As of 2020, Johnsson has returned to private life. Scott Powers of The Athletic attempted to reach Johnsson, but he declined an interview via his agent.

International play
Played for Sweden in the XIX Olympic Winter Games in 2002.

Career statistics

Regular season and playoffs

International

Awards and honors
2001–02: Barry Ashbee Trophy (Best Defenseman (Philadelphia Flyers))
2003–04: Barry Ashbee Trophy (Best Defenseman (Philadelphia Flyers))

References

External links
 

1976 births
Chicago Blackhawks players
HC Ambrì-Piotta players
Ice hockey players at the 2002 Winter Olympics
Living people
Malmö Redhawks players
Minnesota Wild players
New York Rangers draft picks
New York Rangers players
Olympic ice hockey players of Sweden
Philadelphia Flyers players
Sportspeople from Malmö
Stanley Cup champions
Swedish expatriate ice hockey players in the United States
Swedish ice hockey defencemen